Oana Georgeta Simion (born 8 March 1996) is a Romanian tennis player.

Simion has a career-high singles ranking by the Women's Tennis Association (WTA) of 380, achieved 26 July 2021. She also has a career-high WTA doubles ranking of 272, set on 21 November 2022.

Simion made her WTA Tour main-draw debut at the 2021 Winners Open.

ITF Circuit finals

Singles: 21 (9 titles, 12 runner–ups)

Doubles: 52 (31 titles, 21 runner–ups)

References

External links
 
 

1996 births
Living people
Romanian female tennis players
21st-century Romanian women